The Glasgow Open was a European Tour golf tournament which was played annually at Haggs Castle Golf Club in Glasgow from 1983 to 1985. The most distinguished of the three winners was future World Number 1 Bernhard Langer of Germany. In 1985 the prize fund was £90,348, which was slightly below average for a European Tour event at that time.

Winners

References

External links
Coverage on the European Tour's official site

Former European Tour events
Golf tournaments in Scotland
Defunct golf tournaments
International sports competitions in Glasgow
Defunct sports competitions in Scotland
Pollokshields
Recurring sporting events disestablished in 1985
Recurring sporting events established in 1983
1983 establishments in Scotland
1985 disestablishments in Scotland